Cidariplura is a genus of moths of the family Erebidae. The genus was erected by Arthur Gardiner Butler in 1879.

Species
Cidariplura albolineata (Bethune-Baker, 1908) New Guinea
Cidariplura atayal Wu et al., 2013 Taiwan
Cidariplura brevivittalis (Moore, 1867) Bengal, Japan, Taiwan
Cidariplura butleri (Leech, 1900)
Cidariplura chalybealis (Moore, 1867) Darjeeling
Cidariplura dinawa (Bethune-Baker, 1908) New Guinea
Cidariplura dubia (Butler, 1889) Dharmsala
Cidariplura gladiata Butler, 1879 Japan, Korea, China, Taiwan
Cidariplura ilana Wu et al., 2013 Taiwan
Cidariplura maraho Wu et al., 2013 Taiwan
Cidariplura modesta (Leech, 1900) western China
Cidariplura nigristigma (Leech, 1900) Sichuan
Cidariplura ochreistigma (Leech, 1900)
Cidariplura olivens (Bethune-Baker, 1908) New Guinea
Cidariplura perfusca (Swinhoe, 1895) Malaysia
Cidariplura shanmeii Wu et al., 2013 Taiwan
Cidariplura signata (Butler, 1876) Japan, Korea, China

References

External links
Wu, Shipher, et al. (2013). "Review of the genus Cidariplura Butler, 1879 (Lepidoptera, Erebidae, Herminiinae) in Taiwan with descriptions of four new species". Zootaxa 3746.1: 143–160. 

Hypeninae